Bikeman Island is a submerged islet about a half-hour's canoe ride northeast of Betio, Kiribati. Due to changing currents and the construction of a causeway between Betio and Bairiki, Bikeman has been submerged since the early 1990s. If one were to stand on Bikeman today, the water would reach up to one's knees.

See also

 Tarawa
 Desert island
 List of islands

References

Further reading 
Vogel, Scott (April 20, 2001). "That sinking feeling". Honolulu Star-Bulletin. Retrieved March 14, 2013. "A fisherman wades over land that was formerly above water.  The lost island of Bikeman offers a vivid example of the danger facing Pacific islands as global warming causes rising waters."

Uninhabited islands of Kiribati
South Tarawa
Former islands
Islands of Kiribati